Jason Caswell (born June 7, 1974, in Winnipeg, Manitoba) is a Canadian sport shooter. He competed at the 1996 and 2000 Summer Olympics. In 1996, he placed 53rd in the men's skeet event. In 2000, he tied for 19th place in the men's skeet event.

References

1974 births
Living people
Sportspeople from Winnipeg
Skeet shooters
Canadian male sport shooters
Shooters at the 1996 Summer Olympics
Shooters at the 2000 Summer Olympics
Olympic shooters of Canada
Commonwealth Games medallists in shooting
Commonwealth Games silver medallists for Canada
Shooters at the 2010 Commonwealth Games
Pan American Games medalists in shooting
Pan American Games silver medalists for Canada
Shooters at the 1995 Pan American Games
20th-century Canadian people
21st-century Canadian people
Medallists at the 2010 Commonwealth Games